The Tacarcuna bat (Lasiurus castaneus) is a species of vesper bat. It is found in Costa Rica, Panama and possibly Colombia.

References

Lasiurus
Bats of Central America
Mammals described in 1960
Taxonomy articles created by Polbot